Mattia Trovato (born 27 January 1998) is an Italian football player. He plays for Rende.

Club career

Fiorentina

Loan to Cosenza 
On 20 July 2017, Trovato was signed by Serie C side Cosenza on a season-long loan deal. On 21 October he made his Serie C debut for Cosenza as a substitute replacing Massimo Loviso in the 92nd minute of a 2–1 home win over Bisceglie. On 28 January 2018, Trovato played his first match as a starter for Cosenza, a 1–1 away draw against Fidelis Andria, he was replaced by Domenico Mungo in the 77th minute. On 11 February he played his first entire match for Cosenza, a 2–2 away draw against Catania. On 25 March he was sent off with a red card in the 45th minute of a 0–0 home draw against Akragas. Trovato ended his loan to Cosenza with 19 appearances and he helped the club to reach the promotion in Serie B.

On 19 July 2018 his loan was extended for another season. In October, he injured his anterior cruciate ligament in training. The club reported that his recovery time is expected to be five months. On 5 May 2019, Trovato returned from the injury and he made his Serie B debut for Cosenza in a 2–1 away win over Salernitana, he was replaced by Carlos Embalo after 46 minutes. This was the only match that he played this season for Cosenza.

Loan to Livorno
On 31 January 2020, he moved on loan to Livorno.

Loan to Albinoleffe 
On 6 September 2020 he moved to Albinoleffe on loan.

Rende
On 1 February 2022, Trovato's contract with Fiorentina was terminated and he joined Rende in Serie D.

International career 
Trovato represented Italy at Under-15, Under-16 and Under-18 level. On 19 February 2013, Trovato made his debut at U-15 level in a 2–1 away win over Belgium U-15, he scored his first international goal in the 67th minute. On 5 November 2013, Trovato made his debut at U-16 level in a 1–1 home draw against Austria U-16, he was replaced by Fabio Castellano in the 56th minute. On 14 January 2016 he made his debut at U-18 level as a substitute replacing Francesco Puntoriere in the 74th minute of a 6–0 home win over Belgium U-18.

Career statistics

Club

References

External links
 

1998 births
Living people
People from Barcellona Pozzo di Gotto
Sportspeople from the Province of Messina
Italian footballers
Italy youth international footballers
ACF Fiorentina players
Cosenza Calcio players
U.S. Livorno 1915 players
U.C. AlbinoLeffe players
Rende Calcio 1968 players
Serie B players
Serie C players
Association football midfielders
Footballers from Sicily